A unicase or unicameral alphabet has just one case for its letters. Arabic, Brahmic scripts like Telugu, Kannada, Malayalam, Tamil, Old Hungarian (Hungarian Runic), Hebrew, Iberian, Georgian, and Hangul are unicase writing systems, while (modern) Latin, Greek, Cyrillic, and Armenian are bicameral, as they have two cases for each letter, e.g., B/b, Β/β, Б/б, Բ/բ. Individual characters can also be called unicameral if they are used as letters with a generally bicameral alphabet but have only one form for both cases; for example, ʻokina, used in Polynesian languages, and glottal stop (ʔ) as used in Nuu-chah-nuulth.

Most alphabets today with two cases were once unicase. Latin used to be written with a unicase alphabet in imperial Roman times; it was only later that scribes developed new sets of symbols for running text, which became the lower case of the Latin alphabet, while the letterforms of Ancient Rome came to be called capitals or upper case.

A unicase version of the Latin alphabet was proposed by Michael Mann and David Dalby in 1982 as a variation of the Niamey African Reference Alphabet. This version has apparently never been actively used. Another example of unicase Latin alphabet is the Initial Teaching Alphabet. Occasionally some fonts use unicase designs to create an unusual effect; this was particularly popular in the 1960s.

The International Phonetic Alphabet only uses lowercase Latin (and Greek) letters and some scaled upper-case letters (small caps), effectively making it a unicase alphabet, although it is not used for ordinary writing of any language.

Latin alphabets in modern times that are unicase include Saanich (uppercase except for the suffix -s) in Canada, and palawa kani (lowercase) of Tasmania in Australia.

See also
Alphabet 26
Letter case

References

Georgian Nuskhuri, Unicode 4.1.0, 

Writing systems
Orthography
Typography